Alicia, officially the Municipality of Alicia (formerly known as Angadanan Viejo), is a 1st class municipality in the province of Isabela, Philippines. According to the 2020 census, it has a population of 73,874 people.

The municipality is located in an area of predominantly flat and fertile land in the Cagayan Valley that is surrounded by the Caraballo Mountains to the south, the Great Sierra Madre to the east, and the Cordillera Mountain Range to the west. It is the largest rice producer in the entire Cagayan Valley and has the largest irrigated rice field in the whole Region II of the Philippines.

Alicia, the old town of Angadanan, is known for the Pagay Festival Balitok Ti Alicia and its famous historical landmark, the Our Lady of Atocha Church completed and inaugurated in 1849 which was officially declared by the Philippine Department of Tourism as a national religious tourist destination in the Philippines.

Etymology
When President Elpidio Quirino signed Executive Order No. 268 on 28 September 1949, Old Angadanan was formally created and renamed Alicia after his late wife, Doña Alicia Syquía Quirino. Along with three of their children (except Tomás, a soldier, and Victoria, who later became First Lady for her father), Doña Alicia was one of many civilians massacred by Japanese occupiers on 9 February 1945 during the Battle of Manila.

History
Alicia was once called "Angadanan Viejo" jonald big name(which means "Old Angadanan") when the new Angadanan was relocated in 1776 to its current location near the Angadanan Creek.

The old Angadanan town was part of the Cagayan Valley province. The entire Cagayan Valley was one large province which the Spaniards called La Provincia del Valle de Cagayan, but divided into two new provinces in 1839 by the Spanish conquistadors. One retained the old name Cagayan which comprised all towns from Aparri to Tumauini; while a new province of Nueva Vizcaya was created composed of all towns from Ilagan City to the Caraballo del Sur including Catalangan, Angadanan (now Alicia), and Palanan, with Camarag (Echague) as its capital.

A Royal Decree was created on 1 May 1856 creating Isabela de Luzon to distinguish it from other Isabelas in the Philippines. It comprised the town of Carig (now Santiago City), Camarag (now Echague), Angadanan (now Alicia), Cauayan, Calanusian (now Reina Mercedes), Gamu, and Ilagan City, all detached from Nueva Vizcaya; while Tumauini and Cabagan were taken from the Cagayan province. It was placed under the jurisdiction of a governor with the capital seat at Ilagan City, where it remains at the present.

Geography
Alicia has a total land area of 15, 410 hectares and 64, 339 total population as of 2009. 
71% of the total land area is an agricultural land which makes Alicia primarily an agricultural municipality best suited for the intensive production of rice and corn. Farming is its major livelihood and rice its major product and resource.

Barangays
Alicia is politically subdivided into 34 barangays:. These barangays are headed by elected officials: Barangay Captain, Barangay Council, whose members are called Barangay Councilors. All are elected every three years.

There are seven barangays that are currently considered urban (highlighted in bold).

Climate

Demographics

Language
The population is a combination of different ethnic group dominated by Ilocano speaking people which make Ilocano the common language used in the municipality. English, being one of the official languages is used primarily in communication for government publications, local newsprints, road signs, commercial signs and in doing official business transactions. Tagalog, another official language and is also considered the national language is used as verbal communication channel between residents.

Economy 

Alicia, as a suburb of a progressive city, Cauayan, Isabela, is also showing signs of progress. Various banking institutions like Landbank of the Philippines, Security Bank, etc. are already present in Alicia. In 2013, popular fast food chain Jollibee has opened its first branch in Alicia which includes Drive Thru service.

Tourism

Our Lady of Atocha Church
The Our Lady of Atocha Church in Alicia is known for having an old Spanish church architecture. It is one of the best churches to visit for a pilgrimage in the Philippines during the Holy Week. The church was declared by the Philippine Department of Tourism as one of the national religious tourist attractions in the Philippines.

The structure of the church was original built by the Spaniards in the 18th century, but not finished. Passing by Angadanan town on 12 February 1805, Fr. Manuel Mora, OP wrote that "Angadanan has a convent of bricks, though not totally finished. Its church is timber, wood, and bamboo. The number of inhabitants is 791." The church and convent as seen today in the town of Alicia, beautiful and antique, was built by Fr. Tomas Calderon, OP and inaugurated in 1849, with Fr. Francisco Gainza, OP, then vicar of Carig (now Santiago City). The church was dedicated to the Nuestra Señora de Atocha, more popularly known today as Our Lady of Atocha. The church is known for its antique Castilian architectural design and can be found along the Maharlika Highway and is accessible by land transport.

The Catholic churches in Alicia, Gamu, and Cauayan, are examples of what is called as the "Cagayan Style" of Spanish churches that was inspired by the Tuguegarao church.

Government

Local government
The municipality is governed by a mayor designated as its local chief executive and by a municipal council as its legislative body in accordance with the Local Government Code. The mayor, vice mayor, and the councilors are elected directly by the people through an election which is being held every three years.

The first municipal mayor of the town was Glicerio Acosta who was appointed to office by the President of the Philippines upon the creation of Alicia as a municipality in 1949. The mayor and other elective officials are restricted to three consecutive terms, totaling nine years, although a mayor can be elected again after an interruption of one term.

Elected officials

Congress representation
Alicia, belonging to the third legislative district of the province of Isabela, currently represented by Hon. Ian Paul L. Dy.

Education
The Schools Division of Isabela governs the town's public education system. The division office is a field office of the DepEd in Cagayan Valley region. The office governs the public and private elementary and public and private high schools throughout the municipality.

Alicia has two universities that cater to the people of the municipality and other neighboring municipalities and provinces. Alicia is also noted for having the most high-tech school in the region.

College and University
 Northeast Luzon Adventist College
 Philippine Normal University- Northern Luzon Campus

High schools
Private:
 Odizee School of Achievers
 School of Our Lady of Atocha
 Dalton Academy
 Northeast Luzon Adventist College
 Taps Alicia Private School 
 Xavier's School for Gifted Youngsters

Public:
 Alicia National High School
 Alicia Vocational School
 Palayan Region High School
 Rizal Region National High School, Alicia, Isabela

Elementary schools
Private:
 Adventist School Alicia Campus
 Faith Christian Academy
 Northeast Luzon Adventist College
 Odizee School of Achievers
 School of Our Lady of Atocha
 St. Francis School Foundation
 St. John Adaptive Montessori School
 Top Achievers Private School
 Ay Kun School

Public:

Media
There is one FM radio station that operates in the municipality which is 107.1 TAPS Radio.

References

External links

 Local Government of Alicia Isabela
 Municipal Profile at the National Competitiveness Council of the Philippines
 Alicia at the Isabela Government Website
 Local Governance Performance Management System
 [ Philippine Standard Geographic Code]
 Philippine Census Information

Municipalities of Isabela (province)
Populated places on the Rio Grande de Cagayan
Establishments by Philippine executive order